D43 motorway, formerly Expressway R43  is a highway in the Czech Republic. If completed, it will connect cities Brno and Moravská Třebová, and the D1 highway with the R35 expressway.

First project in that route was created after Munich Agreement by Nazi Germany, as an ex-territorial Autobahn A88 Breslau - Wien, passing through territory of The Second Republic of Czechoslovakia with custom houses on all exits. Construction began in April 1939, during German occupation of Czechoslovakia and was halted on 73 km of route in April 1942 due to the increasing demands of World War II. After war construction was not resumed, whole route was abandoned.

In 1980s a modern plan for R43 was set up and first 7 km long segment from Brno to north was built. In 1990s plans of southern section with route straight through town centre of Brno were abandoned and other alternatives are considered, some of them using line of German autobahn. Existing segment of R43 is used as feeder only in some alternatives. Plans for northern part are using main part of German autobahn.

Images

External links 
Info on ceskedalnice.cz 
Info on dalnice-silnice.cz 
Info about abandoned A88 

R43
Proposed roads in the Czech Republic